Dafydd Hywel is a Welsh actor who has worked extensively in television roles and movies in both Welsh and English medium since 1969. He is best known for playing Glen Brennig in the Sky1 TV comedy drama series Stella.

Dafydd also narrated Video 125s 'The Cambrian Coast' Railway Drivers Eye View Video in 1988.

Filmography

Film

TV

References

External links
 

Living people
Welsh male television actors
People from Garnant
1945 births